Transient receptor potential cation channel subfamily M member 3 is a protein that in humans is encoded by the TRPM3 gene.

Function 

The product of this gene belongs to the family of transient receptor potential (TRP) channels. TRP channels are Ca2+ permeable non-selective cation channels that play roles in a wide variety of physiological processes, including calcium signaling, heat and cold sensation, calcium and magnesium homeostasis. TRPMs mediates sodium and calcium entry, which induces depolarization and a cytoplasmic Ca2+ signal. Alternatively spliced transcript variants encoding different isoforms have been -identified.
TRPM3 was shown to be activated by the neurosteroid pregnenolone sulfate as well as the synthetic compound CIM0216.

Peripheral heat sensation 
TRPM3 is expressed in peripheral sensory neurons of the dorsal root ganglia, and they are activated by high temperatures. Genetic deletion of TRPM3 in mice reduces sensitivity to noxious heat, as well as inflammatory thermal hyperalgesia. Inhibitors of TRPM3 were also shown to reduce noxious heat and inflammatory heat hyperalgesia, as well as reduce heat hyperalgesia and spontaneous pain in nerve injury induced neuropathic pain.

Receptor mediated inhibition 
TRPM3 is robustly inhibited by the activation of cell surface receptors that couple to inhibitory heterotrimeric G-proteins (Gi) via direct binding of the Gβγ subunit of the G-protein to the channel. Gβγ was shown to bind to a short α-helical segment of the channel.  Receptors that inhibit TRPM3 include opioid receptors and GABAB receptors.

TRPM3 in the brain 
Mutations in TRPM3 in humans, were recently shown to cause a intellectual disability and epilepsy. The disease associated mutations were shown to increase the sensitivity of the channel to agonists, and heat.

TRPM3 ligands, activators and modulators

Activators
Heat
Pregnenolone Sulfate
CIM-0216

Channel Blockers
Mefenamic acid
Citrus fruit flavonoids, e.g. naringenin, isosakuranetin and hesperetin, as well as ononetin (a deoxybenzoin).
Primidone, a clinically used antiepileptic medication also directly inhibits TRPM3.

Activity Modulator 

 pH

See also 
 TRPM

References

Further reading

External links 
 

Ion channels